Queen Mundeok of the Chungju Yu clan was a Goryeo princess as the youngest daughter and child of King Gwangjong and Queen Daemok, also the youngest sister of King Gyeongjong. She firstly married Wang Gyu, but after his death remarried again and became a queen consort through her marriage with her half first cousin, King Seongjong as his first and primary wife. From this marriage, Queen Mundeok became the fifth reigned Goryeo queen who followed her maternal clan after Queen Heonjeong, her half first cousin and the first Goryeo queen who remarried. Although her death date was unknown, but seeing that her son-in-law (formerly nephew), King Mokjong gave her Posthumous names in 997, so it seems that she died before that.

Posthumous name
In April 1002 (5th year reign of King Mokjong), name Hyo-gong (효공, 孝恭) was added.
In March 1014 (5th year reign of King Hyeonjong), name Sun-seong (순성, 順聖) was added.
In April 1027 (18th year reign of King Hyeonjong), name Yeong-yong (영용, 英容) and Suk-jeol (숙절, 肅節) was added.
In October 1056 (10th year reign of King Munjong), name Won-heon (원헌(元獻) was added.
In October 1253 (40th year reign of King Gojong), name Seon-wi (선위, 宣威) was added to her Posthumous name too.

In popular culture
Portrayed by Lee Hyun-kyung and Baek Seung-hee in the 2009 KBS2 TV series Empress Cheonchu.

References

External links
Queen Mundeok on Encykorea .
문덕왕후 on Doosan Encyclopedia .

Royal consorts of the Goryeo Dynasty
Korean queens consort
10th-century Korean people
Year of birth unknown
Year of death unknown
Goryeo princesses